The 2020–21 synchronized skating season began on July 1, 2020, and ended on June 30, 2021. Running concurrent with the 2020–21 figure skating season. During this season, elite synchronized skating teams were set to compete in the ISU Championship level at the 2021 World Championships, and through the Challenger Series. They also were set to compete at various other elite level international and national competitions; Though ultimately no international competitions were actually held due to the COVID-19 pandemic.

Impact of the COVID-19 pandemic 
Though international competitions were planned for the season, all were cancelled in a series of communications throughout the competitive season.

Due to travel restrictions and competition organizing difficulties related to the COVID-19 pandemic no world standing/ranking points were to be awarded.

Competitions 
The 2020–21 season had the following competitions scheduled.

 Key

International medalists

References 

2020 in figure skating
2021 in figure skating
Seasons in synchronized skating